The Iwaidja are an indigenous Australian people of the Northern Territory.

Name
Norman Tindale states that the name is based on their word for 'no' (ii).

Language
Iwaidja is one of the Iwaidjan languages of the Cobourg Peninsula, all of which are non-Pama–Nyungan languages. It is still spoken by some 150 speakers, at Minjilang on Croker Island.

Country
Their centre was at Mountnorris Bay, in the eastern area of the Cobourg Peninsula. Tindale interprets Paul Foelsche's Unalla as a reference to the Iwaidja. Foelsche informed Edward Micklethwaite Curr that:
'The country frequented by this tribe extends from Raffles Bay to Port Essington Harbour and thence midway up the Cobourg Peninsula to Popham Bay.

Their neighbours were the Ajokoot, Wurango, Angara-Pingan, and Yiarik

Social organization
Four other groups were reported to share the same territory, though for Tindale their status as either hordes or independent tribes was undetermined. They were listed as:

 Wonga:ran (in the mainland area immediately opposite Croker Island
 Ka:ri:k. (east of Cape Don)
 Nga:dalwuli. (a coastal people lying to the east of the Ka:ri:k.)
 Mandu:wit. (northwest, and east of the Nga:dalwuli).

History of contact
If we take the Unalla as interchangeable with the Iwaidja, they were a once numerous tribe which, with the onset of colonial settlement, was reduced to a mere 30 members by 1881, consisting of 7 men, 12 women, 9 boys and 2 girls. Foelsche stated that the community was ravaged after Malay traders introduced smallpox (mea-mea) during a visit in 1866.

Alternative names

 Eae-warge-ga
 Eaewardja
 Eaewarga
 Eiwaja
 Iwaija
 Iwaiji
 Iyi
 Ji:wadja
 Jiwadja
 Juwadja
 Limba-Karadjee
 Limbakaraja
 Tarula. (Melville Islanders exonym meaning 'riflemen'.
 Unalla
 Uwaidja

Some words
 illpoogee (kangaroo)
 kamoomoo. (mother)
 looloot. (tame dog)
 lurkakie. (wild dog)
 nowajuk. (father)
 warranganababoo. (white man)

Source:

Notes

Citations

Sources

Aboriginal peoples of the Northern Territory